Harriett Alleyne Rice (1866–1958) was the first African American to graduate from Wellesley College. She was awarded the Medal of French Gratitude for her contributions in World War I.

Early life 
Rice was born in Newport, Rhode Island. Rice graduated from Rogers High School in 1882.

Career 
She was the first African-American graduate of Wellesley College in 1887. After attending University of Michigan medical school for a year from 1888 to 1889, she obtained her MD in 1891 from the Women's Medical College of the New York Infirmary for Women and Children. However, as an African-American woman in this era she was unable to practice medicine in any American hospital, and so she joined the social worker and suffragist leader Jane Addams at Hull House in Chicago, where she provided medical treatment for the poor. In 1897 she joined Chicago Maternity Hospital and Training School for Nursery Maids as the only doctor. When World War I broke out Rice traveled to France and practiced as a medical intern at a hospital in Poitiers, staying for almost four years. For this she was recognized by the French Embassy and awarded the Medal of French Gratitude.

She died in Worcester, Massachusetts in 1958 and is buried in Newport's Common Burying Ground.

References 

1866 births
1958 deaths
Wellesley College alumni
19th-century American women physicians
19th-century American physicians
African-American women physicians
Place of birth missing
Date of birth missing
20th-century American physicians
20th-century American women physicians
People from Newport, Rhode Island
Physicians from Rhode Island
20th-century African-American women
20th-century African-American physicians